HMS St Albans was a 64-gun third rate ship of the line of the Royal Navy, launched on 12 September 1764 by Perry, Wells & Green at their Blackwall Yard, London.

She sailed with a complement of 525 men and 64 guns with a draught of 1,380 tons and a gun deck of 159 ft 6ins x 42 ft. This type of ship was the second biggest class of ships-of-the-line on the navy list with 39 ships in 1793, and 41 in 1812. The 64 was essentially a cut price 74-gun ship; it had neither the gun power nor the sailing qualities of the latter. but more could be produced for the money. It was not a popular class with naval officers.

She served in the American War of Independence from 1777 and was part of the fleet that captured St Lucia and won victories at Battle of St. Kitts and The Saintes. She was converted to a floating battery in 1813 and was broken up in 1814.

Career

Captain Richard Onslow took command of St Albans on 31 October 1776. He took a convoy to New York City in April 1777 and joined Lord Howe in time for the repulse of d'Estaing on 22 July 1777 at Sandy Hook. She captured 2 prizes in December, 1777, at least 2 in February, sloops Defiance and Shore, 2 in March, and 1 by her tender in April, 1778. Onslow sailed for the West Indies on 4 November 1778 with Commodore Hotham, and took part in the capture of Saint Lucia and its defence against d'Estaing that December at the Cul-de-Sac. In August 1779, he brought a convoy from St Kitts to Spithead.

On 10 December 1780, St Albans, in company with Vestal, Portland and Solebay captured the Comtess de Buzancois.

Captain Charles Inglis took command of St Albans in November 1780. He was with Admiral Robert Digby's squadron later that year, before being sent to the Leeward Islands to join Sir Samuel Hood at Barbados.

St Albans was with Hood during the Battle of Saint Kitts, when Hood attempted to relieve the island and repulsed several attacks by the Comte de Grasse on 25 and 26 January 1782. Inglis was again in action with the French on 9 April, when Hood's fleet clashed with de Grasse's in the Dominica Channel, and fought at the Battle of the Saintes on 12 April, where the main British fleet under Inglis's old captain, now Admiral Sir George Rodney, decisively defeated de Grasse. St Albans had six men wounded during this engagement.

St Albans sailed to North America in late July 1782 with Rodney's successor, Admiral Hugh Pigot. She was back in the West Indies by November, where Inglis was given command of a squadron of four ships cruising independently there. The squadron, consisting of St Albans, the 64-gun , the 74-gun  and the sloop , was sent from Gros Islet Bay on 12 February to investigate reports of a French squadron, consisting of Triton, Amphion and several frigates, having sailed from Martinique.

On 15 February 1783 the 74-gun Magnificent, under Captain Robert Linzee. was on a cruise in company with Prudent and St Albans. Magnificent sighted a strange sail and gave chase. She was close enough to identify the mysterious ship as a frigate by 18:00, and by 20:00 as darkness fell the quarry opened fire on her pursuer with her stern guns. Magnificent overhauled the French ship by 21:15, and after fifteen minutes forced her to strike her colours. Shortly after surrendering, Concordes maintopsail caught fire, forcing the crew to cut away the mainmast to extinguish it. Prudent and St Albans came up two hours later and Magnificent towed Concorde to St. John's, Antigua.

St Albans and  shared in the capture on 8 November of the brig Molly.

In April 1810 she served on the China station under Captain Francis Austen

From November 1810 she was in Chatham for re-fitting under Captain Edward Brace.

From December 1810 she was at Spithead then on Cadiz station until December 1812 under Brace and captains Charles Grant & John Devonshire.

She was taken out of commission and docked in Chatham for refit December 1812 - October 1813

Fate

By September 1813, St Albans was converted to be used as a floating battery. She was broken up in June 1814.

Citations and references
Citations

References

Lavery, Brian (2003) The Ship of the Line - Volume 1: The development of the battlefleet 1650-1850. Conway Maritime Press. .

Ships of the line of the Royal Navy
St Albans-class ships of the line
1764 ships
Ships built by the Blackwall Yard
Floating batteries of the Royal Navy